The 2010–11 Iowa Hawkeyes men's basketball team represented the University of Iowa in the 2010–11 college basketball season. The team was led by head coach Fran McCaffery and played their home games at Carver-Hawkeye Arena, which has been their home since 1983. They were members of the Big Ten Conference. They finished the season 11–20, 4–14 in Big Ten play to finish in 10th place and lost in the first round of the Big Ten tournament to Michigan State.

Roster

2010 Commitments

Schedule and results 
Source

|-
!colspan=12| Exhibition

|-
!colspan=12| Regular Season

|-
!colspan=12| Big Ten tournament

References

Iowa Hawkeyes Men's Basketball Team, 2010-11
Iowa Hawkeyes men's basketball seasons
Hawk
Hawk